Renee Ilene Sandstrom (born February 15, 1974) is an American singer and former child actress better known by her stage name Renee Sands. She is best known for her role as Renee on Kids Incorporated, and as a vocal member of the American girl group Wild Orchid (group).

Early life
Sands was born in Worcester, Massachusetts. Renee is the youngest of four children. She grew up singing and had a band with her family.

Career
In 1983, Sands starred in the pilot of the hit 1980s musical children's show Kids Incorporated. It was never released on television, but was released on VHS in 1985. She starred on the show's first four seasons from 1984 to 1987, where she eventually became the oldest female character. She started on the show at the age of 10 and ended at 13.

Sands also opened for acts that include Wayne Newton, Bob Hope, and Debbie Reynolds. She sang on the children's chorus with other Kids Incorporated cast members on Martika's hit "Toy Soldiers". Starring on Kids Incorporated with Martika from 1983 to 1986.

From 1990 to 2003, alongside her former Kids Incorporated costar (Tv sister), Stacy Ferguson, and her high school friend, Stefanie Ridel, Sands was a member of the 1990s band Wild Orchid. She was a member through the band's entirety.

Wild Orchid was an American girl group consisting of Stacy Ferguson, Stefanie Ridel, and Renee Sandstrom. Beginning under the name "NRG" in 1990, the group changed their name to Wild Orchid in 1992 and signed with RCA Records in 1994. The group released two albums, earning Billboard Music Awards nominations with their debut. In 2001, Ferguson left the group. Sandstrom and Ridel continued as a duo, releasing Wild Orchid's final album Hypnotic in 2003. In 2013, Us Weekly named the group number 18 of the 25 'Best Girl Groups of All Time'.

Since then Sands has provided the singing voice for Princess Fiona in (Shrek) Far Far Away Idol,  played Young Darlene in California Indian, sang "Pump It Up", used as the theme song on the Crystal Light commercials, according to Kraft Foods, Inc.. She sang "Just Like We Dreamed It" with Ruben Martinez as the 15th anniversary theme for Disneyland Paris. She had a role in the Disney Channel Original Movie Camp Rock, providing the singing voice for Jasmine Richards' character Margaret "Peggy" Dupree, singing the song "Here I Am". She sang "Love from Afar" on the soundtrack for Just Friends. Starred in the movie, Pink Ladies. As a child finished second to Scott grimes on a Boston talent show called, Community Auditions.

In 2012, she sang "I Think I Like You" with the band Eagle Eye. The song was featured in season two of Dance Moms. In 2021, Renee sang the theme song for the new Disney Junior show The Chicken Squad.

Personal life
On October 10, 2008, Renee was married in a private ceremony in Los Angeles, California to retirement investment expert Robby Welles. The couple has a daughter.

References

External links
 

1974 births
Living people
20th-century American women singers
20th-century American singers
21st-century American women singers
21st-century American singers
American child actresses
American television actresses
American women pop singers
Actresses from Worcester, Massachusetts
Musicians from Worcester, Massachusetts
Wild Orchid (group) members